Alaguvelu is a surname. Notable people with the surname include:

K. Alaguvelu, Indian politician
S. Alaguvelu, Indian politician